Yunus Emre Institute is a world-wide non-profit organization created by the Turkish government in 2007. Named after the famous 14th-century poet Yunus Emre, it aims to promote the Turkish language and the culture around the world. It has been regarded as a Turkish soft power institution and was created via a decree by Recep Tayyip Erdoğan. The activities, branching, and networking of the institute, has most intensely been centered in and around the Balkans region.

List of locations

  – Ankara
  – Tiranë
  – Shkodër
  – Prishtinë
  – Prizren
  – Pejë
  – Kabul
  – Algiers
  - Buenos Aires
  – Melbourne
  – Vienna
  – Baku
  – Manama
  – Brussels
  – Fojnica
  – Mostar
  – Sarajevo
  - Toronto
  - Beijing
  – Zagreb
  – Nicosia
  – Cairo
  – London
  – Paris
  – Tbilisi
  – Berlin
  – Cologne
  – Budapest
  – Tehran
  – Dublin
  – Rome
  – Tokyo
  – Amman
  – Astana
  – Beirut
  – Skopje
  – Kuala Lumpur
  – Mexico City
  – Comrat
  – Podgorica
  – Rabat
  – Amsterdam
  – Abuja
  - Karachi
  - Lahore
  – East Jerusalem
  – Ramallah
  – Warsaw
  – Doha
  – Bucharest
  – Constanța
  – Moscow 
  - Kazan
  - Kigali
  - Dakar
  – Belgrade
  – Mogadishu
  – Johannesburg
  - Seoul
  - Madrid
  – Khartoum
  - Azaz
  – Tunis
  - Kyiv
  – Washington, DC

References

External links 

  

Organizations established in 2007
Cultural promotion organizations
Foreign relations of Turkey
Turkish language
Language education
Cultural organizations based in Turkey
2007 establishments in Turkey